The Vidalia City School District is a public school district in Toombs County, Georgia, United States, based in and serving Vidalia.

Schools
The Vidalia City School District has two elementary schools, one middle school, and one high school.

Elementary schools
J. D. Dickerson Primary School (Grades Pre-K through 1st)
Sally Dailey Meadows Elementary School (Grades 2nd through 5th)

Middle school
J. R. Trippe Middle School (Grades 6th through 8th)

High school
Vidalia Comprehensive High School (Grades 9th through 12th)

Vidalia High School State Titles
Baseball (2) - 1995(2A), 2003(2A), 2022 (2A)
Cheerleading (3) - 2004(2A), 2017(2A), 2020(2A)
Football (1) - 1969(B) 
Boys' Golf (9) - 1972(A), 1973(A), 1984(2A), 1985(2A), 1993(2A), 1998(2A), 1999(2A), 2003(2A), 2004(2A)
Girls' Golf (6) - 2011(2A), 2013(2A), 2014(2A), 2015(2A), 2016(2A), 2017(2A)
Slow Pitch Softball (2) - 1986(2A), 2002(A/2A/3A)
Boys' Track (1) - 2017(2A)
Girls' Track (1) - 2018(2A)

Other GHSA State Titles
Literary (2) - 1971(A), 1985(2A)

References

External links

School districts in Georgia (U.S. state)
Education in Toombs County, Georgia